Villa Pehuenia is a village and municipality in Neuquén Province in southwestern Argentina. The town is located on the northern shore of Aluminé Lake and its economy is primarily based on tourism. The town is named after the pehuén or monkey puzzle tree (Araucaria araucana), an endangered species found here at the southernmost limit of its range.

History
The Mapuche people moved into this region from Chile in the 18th century, absorbing the earlier indigenous people and dominating the region until the late 19th century.  Logging was the industry that first attracted settlers of European origin.  The village of Villa Pehuenia was not created until 1989 with a population at that time of 155 people.  The population had grown to 1,611 in 2010, the increase attributable to the increase in tourism. The indigenous Puel people (of Mapuche origin) continue to maintain a community here.

Description
A small ski resort is operated on the slopes of the volcano by the Puel people.

Climate
Villa Pehuenia has a warm-summer mediterranean climate, Csb in the Köppen climate classification system and Crlk (mild summers, cool winters) in the Trewartha climate classification.

References

Populated places in Neuquén Province
Populated lakeshore places in Argentina